Leševo is a village situated in Kraljevo municipality in Serbia.

References

Leševo

Populated places in Raška District